Amrapali Gupta, also as Amrapali Yash Sinha, is an Indian television actress.

Personal life 
Gupta is married to her co-star Yash Sinha from Teen Bahuraaniyaan on 28 November 2012. They have one son together.

Television

See also

References

External links
 

Living people
Actresses from Mumbai
Indian soap opera actresses
Indian television actresses
Actresses in Hindi television
21st-century Indian actresses
Year of birth missing (living people)